Moncestino (Monsëstin in Piedmontese) is a comune (municipality) in the Province of Alessandria in the Italian region Piedmont, located about  east of Turin and about  northwest of Alessandria.

Moncestino borders the following municipalities: Crescentino, Fontanetto Po, Gabiano, Verrua Savoia, and Villamiroglio.

Demographic evolution

References

Cities and towns in Piedmont